"When Love Finds You" is a song co-written and recorded by American country music artist Vince Gill.  It was released in October 1994 as third single and title track from the album When Love Finds You.  The song reached number 3 on the Billboard Hot Country Singles & Tracks chart.  It was written by Gill and Michael Omartian.

Music video
The music video was directed by John Lloyd Miller and premiered in late 1994.

Personnel
Complied from the liner notes.
Vince Gill – lead and backing vocals, electric guitar, electric guitar solo
John Barlow Jarvis – keyboards
Michael Omartian – accordion, piano, synthesizer
Tom Roady – percussion
Randy Scruggs – acoustic guitar
Steuart Smith – electric guitar
Billy Thomas – backing vocals
Carlos Vega – drums
Willie Weeks – bass guitar
Jeff White – backing vocals

Chart performance
"When Love Finds You" debuted at number 58 on the U.S. Billboard Hot Country Singles & Tracks for the week of October 15, 1994.

References

1994 singles
Vince Gill songs
Songs written by Vince Gill
Song recordings produced by Tony Brown (record producer)
Songs written by Michael Omartian
MCA Records singles
Music videos directed by John Lloyd Miller
1994 songs
Grammy Award for Best Male Country Vocal Performance winners